Tsagaan-Ovoo (White ovoo) is a sum (district) of Dornod Province in eastern Mongolia. In 2009, its population was 3,696.

References 

Districts of Dornod Province